Kallehgan (also Romanized as Kallehgān; also known as Kalagan and Qal‘eh Khān) is a village in Rameshk Rural District, Chah Dadkhoda District, Qaleh Ganj County, Kerman Province, Iran. At the 2006 census, its population was 41, in 11 families.

References 

Populated places in Qaleh Ganj County